USCGC Dorado (WPB-87306) was the sixth cutter of the s. Dorado was built at Bollinger Shipyards in Lockport, Louisiana and commissioned in April 1999 and decommissioned on 10 March 2021. Dorado's home port was in Crescent City, California and served under Coast Guard Group Humboldt Bay in the Eleventh Coast Guard District.

After decommissioning, Dorado will be transferred to the Department of Defense's Foreign Military Sales Program and is awaiting sale to an allied partner.

References

Marine Protector-class coastal patrol boats
1999 ships
Ships built in Lockport, Louisiana
Ships of the United States Coast Guard